The Shoal River Formation is a geologic formation in Florida. The sandstones and marls of the formation preserve fossils dating back to the Serravallian epoch of the Middle Miocene of the Neogene period.

See also 
 List of fossiliferous stratigraphic units in Florida

References

Bibliography

Further reading 
 R. W. Portell, G. L. Polites, and G. W. Schmelz. 2006. Mollusca: Shoal River Formation (Middle Miocene. Florida Fossil Invertebrates 9:1-52
 J. R. Gardner. 1947. The Molluscan Fauna of the Alum Bluff Group of Florida. United States Geological Survey Professional Paper (142A-H)1-709
 R. H. Smith. 1941. Micropaleontology and stratigraphy of a deep well at Niceville, Okaloosa County, Florida. Bulletin of the American Association of Petroleum Geologists 25(2):263-286
 M. J. Rathbun. 1935. Fossil Crustacea of the Atlantic and Gulf Coastal Plain. Geological Society of America Special Paper (2)1-160

Geologic formations of Florida
Neogene Florida
Miocene Series of North America
Clarendonian
Serravallian
Sandstone formations
Marl formations
Shallow marine deposits
Paleontology in Florida